Escondido Charter High School (colloquially referred to as Charter and ECHS) is an independent, co-educational, college preparatory day school for grades 9–12 located in Escondido, California. The school opened in 1996 with only 30 students. Since then, the student population has grown to almost 400 in the traditional preparatory program, with over 500 students attending the independent learning program. A Charter education is grounded in a classical "back to basics learning," and the importance of pupil-faculty intellectual discourse. Most classes maintain an average size of 20 students per class.

Academics
Students must complete and pass the California High School Exit Exam, in addition to a final senior thesis that must be sufficiently defended in front of a committee for review.

College matriculation

Recent Charter graduates have matriculated at the following schools:

 Auburn University
 Baylor University
 University of California, Berkeley
 Biola University
 Brigham Young University, Idaho
 Brigham Young University
 Brown University
 Cal Poly San Luis Obispo
 Cal State, Channel Islands
 California Institute of Technology 
 Carleton College
 Dartmouth College
 Davidson College
 Duke University
 University of California, Davis
 Embry-Riddle Aeronautical University
 Florida State University
 The George Washington University
 Georgetown University
 Gettysburg College
 Harvey Mudd College
 University of California, Irvine
 Johns Hopkins University
 University of California, Los Angeles 
 Massachusetts Institute of Technology
 Northern Arizona University
 University of Notre Dame
 University of Oregon
 University of Pennsylvania
 Pepperdine University
 Princeton University
 University of California, Riverside
 Saint Mary's College of California
 San Diego State University
 University of California, Santa Barbara
 University of California, Santa Cruz
 Santa Clara University
 Southern Methodist University
 University of Southern California
 Smith College
 Stanford University
 Syracuse University
 University of California, San Diego
 University of Tennessee, Knoxville
 Texas A&M
 Tulane University
 University of San Diego 
 University of Virginia 
 Vassar College
 Westmont College
 Yale University

Programs

 Traditional Classroom Program (TCP)
 Flex 1:1 (pronounced "one on one")(Previously known as the "ILP" (Individualized Learning Program) program)
 Flex 4-Day Program (previously ICP)

See also 

 Dual Enrollment

References

External links

 American Heritage Charter Schools
Escondido Charter High School Facebook
Escondido Charter High School Independent Learning Program Facebook

High schools in San Diego County, California
Charter high schools in California
Education in Escondido, California
1996 establishments in California